Far North may refer to:

Places
 Far North (Russia), a part of Russia which lies beyond the Arctic Circle
 Far North Alaska, United States
 Far North (Canada)
 Norte Grande, one of the five natural regions of Chile according to CORFO
 Far North District, the administrative district in northern Northland Region, New Zealand
 Far North Region (Cameroon), Cameroon
 Far North (South Australia), a region
 Far North Queensland, Australia
 Far North (New Zealand electorate), a former New Zealand Parliamentary electorate
 Vhembe District Municipality in South Africa, also known as Far North
 Greenland

Other uses
 Far North (1988 film), a film starring Patricia Arquette
 Far North (2007 film), a movie by Asif Kapadia starring Michelle Yeoh and Sean Bean
 Far North (novel), a 2009 novel by author Marcel Theroux
 Ultima Thule, the term given to unknown northern lands in ancient European geography